Ángel Obando is a Honduran retired footballer.

Club career
Nicknamed Toño, he is currently the 11th top goal scorer in the history of the Honduran football league with 83 goals, and the second top scorer of all times for F.C. Motagua with 77.

References

Year of birth missing (living people)
Living people
Honduran footballers
F.C. Motagua players
Liga Nacional de Fútbol Profesional de Honduras players
Association football forwards